The University of South Florida Contemporary Art Museum is a contemporary art museum at the University of South Florida in Tampa, Florida. It opened at its current location in 1989 adjacent to the USF College of the Arts. The museum has presented numerous significant and investigative exhibitions of contemporary art from Florida, the United States and around the world, including Africa, Europe, and Latin America. Changing exhibitions are designed to introduce students, faculty and the community to current cultural trends. Exhibitions to date have included the work of Vito Acconci, Atelier van Lieshout, Frances Barth, Bili Bidjocka, Jim Campbell, James Casebere, Maria Magdalena Campos-Pons, Emily Cheng, Keith Edmier, Zhang Hongtu, Alfredo Jaar, Los Carpinteros, Allan McCollum, Lucy Orta, Pepón Osorio, James Rosenquist, and Ed Ruscha among numerous others.

See also
List of museums in Florida
University of South Florida

References

External links

University of South Florida
1989 establishments in Florida
Museums in Tampa, Florida
Contemporary art galleries in the United States
Museums established in 1989
Art museums and galleries in Florida
University museums in Florida